The 6th Pennsylvania Cavalry was a Union cavalry regiment during the American Civil War. They were known for their early use of 9-foot lances, and were called "Rush's Lancers."

History
The regiment was raised during August and September 1861 from companies raised in Philadelphia, Montgomery and Berks counties by Richard H. Rush, who had been authorized to do so by Governor Curtin. Rush was appointed colonel of the regiment, with John H. M'Arthur as lieutenant colonel and C. Ross Smith and Robert Morris, Jr., as majors. At the suggestion of Maj. Gen. George B. McClellan,  the men were armed with Austrian lances. After several weeks of training in Philadelphia, the regiment was transferred to Washington, D.C., where it was assigned to the Cavalry Division of the Army of the Potomac.

The regiment served with the army during the Peninsula Campaign and Maryland Campaign, skirmishing many times but seeing no heavy fighting. During the Battle of Fredericksburg, it served as the provost guard for the Center Grand Division, guarding the bridges to the grand division's rear. It was absent during the Battle of Chancellorsville, participating instead in Stoneman's Raid.

In the May 1863, the regiment was rearmed with Sharps carbines and assigned to the Reserve Brigade of the 1st Cavalry Division. It fought in the Gettysburg Campaign and Mine Run Campaign. During the Battle of Brandy Station in June 1863, the regiment (led by Major Robert Morris, Jr.) unsuccessfully charged the guns at St. James Church, suffering the greatest casualties of any regiment in the battle. Several Confederates later described the 6th's charge as the most "brilliant and glorious" cavalry charge of the war. (In many Civil War battles, cavalrymen typically dismounted once they reached an engagement and fought essentially as infantry. But in this battle, the surprise and chaos led to a mostly mounted fight.)

The following year, it fought in the Overland Campaign and Sheridan's Valley Campaign among the Valley Campaigns of 1864. In September, the regiment's original enlistments expired, and the unit was reorganized for an additional three years. Following the Appomattox Campaign, it was ordered to Washington, D.C., where it was consolidated with the 1st Pennsylvania Cavalry and 17th Pennsylvania Cavalry to form the 2nd Pennsylvania Provisional Cavalry. The combined regiment was sent to Louisville, Kentucky, where it was mustered out in August 1865.

The 6th Pennsylvania Cavalry had one Medal of Honor Recipient: Captain Frank Furness, commander of Company F. During the Battle of Trevillian Station (June 11–12, 1864), Furness "Voluntarily carried a box of ammunition across an open space swept by the enemy's fire to the relief of an outpost whose ammunition had become almost exhausted, but which was thus enabled to hold its important position," according to the citation for the medal, awarded on October 20, 1899.

Reenactors
A group based in Morrisville, New York portrays Company G.

Casualties
 Killed and mortally wounded: 7 officers, 71 enlisted men
 Died of disease: 3 officers, 86 enlisted men
 Total: 10 officers, 157 enlisted men

Today
In August 1861, members of First Troop, Philadelphia City Cavalry, were mustered in and organized into companies C and E of the 6th Pennsylvania
Cavalry for Federal service in the Civil War. Companies C and E were mustered out on 17 June 1865. The First Troop, Philadelphia City Cavalry (17 November 1774) is the oldest, continuously active Cavalry Troop in the US Army, currently serving as A TRP, 1st/104th CAV, Pennsylvania Army National Guard.  The Civil War campaign streamers of the 6th Pennsylvania Cavalry currently fly from A Troop's guidon along with streamers ranging from the American Revolution to World War II. The Troop recently served in peacekeeping missions in Bosnia (2002-3) and the Sinai (2008).  Numerous artifacts of the 6th Pennsylvania Cavalry are currently housed in the Troop's private museum which is currently closed due to construction.

See also
List of Pennsylvania Civil War regiments

Footnotes

Citations

References

External links
 Pa-roots website
 Reenactors website
 1st Squadron - 104 Cavalry Regiment
 First Troop Philadelphia City Cavalry
 Regimental Roster of the Sixth Pennsylvania Cavalry Regiment

Units and formations of the Union Army from Pennsylvania
1861 establishments in Pennsylvania
Military units and formations established in 1861
Military units and formations disestablished in 1865